Cavallari is a surname. Notable people with the surname include:

 Alberto Cavallari (1927–1998), Italian journalist and writer
 Andrea Cavallari (born 1964), composer and visual artist
Aristide Cavallari (1849–1914), Patriarch of Venice
 Giulio Cavallari (born 1992), Italian footballer
 Kristin Cavallari (born 1987), American television personality and actress
 Simona Cavallari (actress) (born 1971), Italian actress
 Simona Cavallari (handballer) (born 1992), Swiss women's handball player
 Francesco Saverio Cavallari (1809–1896), architect, professor, painter and archeologist
 Ivan Cavallari (born 1964), artistic ballet director

Italian-language surnames